Bayani is a political party in The Philippines.  It formulates policies on education, social justice, labor advancement, poverty alleviation, graph irradiation, and the advancement of marginalized professionals.  Bayani Partylist is not associated with Bayani Fernando.

History
It was founded in 1997 as a multi-sectoral alliance.  During Typhoon Ondoy, the party distributed relief goods to the victims in cities in the Philippines and assisted out of school youth to seek employment.

Sources
 We have brgy. chiefs’ support, says Manila-based party-list | Sun.Star
 

Centrist parties in the Philippines
Ortigas Center